Hyllisia lineata is a species of beetle in the family Cerambycidae. It was described by Gahan in 1894.

References

lineata
Beetles described in 1894
Taxa named by Charles Joseph Gahan